The River Forth is a perennial river located in northwest Tasmania, Australia.

Location and features
The lower part of the river features Lake Barrington, which is a major venue for competitive rowing. It is also the location of the village of Forth.

The river is a part of the Mersey-Forth power project, which includes seven hydroelectric power stations. Three hydroelectric power stations have been built on the Forth River itself, including Cethana Power Station (impounding Lake Cethana); Devils Gate Power Station (impounding Lake Barrington); and Paloona Power Station (impounding Lake Paloona.)

The upper part of the river catchment area is also known as the Forth River High Country and contains the Cradle Mountain-Lake St Clair National Park with the source of the river being on the southern slopes of Mount Pelion West.

See also

References

Rivers of Tasmania
North West Tasmania